Csárdás, often seen as Czárdás, is a traditional Hungarian folk dance, the name derived from  (old Hungarian term for roadside tavern and restaurant). It originated in Hungary and was popularized by bands in Hungary and neighboring lands of Slovenia, Burgenland, Croatia, Transylvania, Slovakia and Moravia, as well as among the Banat Bulgarians, including those in Bulgaria.

History 

The origin of the csárdás can be traced back to the 18th century Hungarian music genre the verbunkos, where the 'verbunk' was used as a recruiting dance by the Austrian army.

The csárdás is characterized by a variation in tempo: it starts out slowly (lassú) and ends in a very fast tempo (friss, literally "fresh"). There are other tempo variations, called ritka csárdás, sűrű csárdás and szökős csárdás. The dancers are both male and female, with the women dressed in traditional wide skirts, which form a distinctive shape when they whirl.

Classical composers who have used csárdás themes in their works include Emmerich Kálmán, Franz Liszt, Johannes Brahms, Léo Delibes, Johann Strauss, Pablo de Sarasate, Pyotr Ilyich Tchaikovsky, Franz von Suppé and others. The csárdás from Strauss' operetta Die Fledermaus, sung by the character Rosalinde, is probably the most famous example of this dance in vocal music. One of the best-known examples of instrumental csárdás is the composition by Vittorio Monti for violin and piano. This virtuoso piece has seven tempo variations.

The original folk csárdás, as opposed to the later international variants, is enjoying a revival in Hungary thanks to the táncház movement.

See also 
 Márk Rózsavölgyi, "the father of csárdás"

References

Bibliography
 Sárosi, Bálint, Zigeunermusik (Gypsy Music), 1977

External links 

 StreetSwing's Dance History Archives: Czardas or Csárdás
 Hungarian Lexikon 
 Hungarian csárdás – around 1200 audiofiles
 

18th-century music genres
Hungarian styles of music
Hungarian dances
Hungarian words and phrases
Dance forms in classical music